Veprecula vacillata is a species of sea snail, a marine gastropod mollusk in the family Raphitomidae.

Subspecies: Veprecula vacillata paucicostata Hedley, 1922

Description
The length of the shell attains 5.5 mm, its diameter 2 mm.

(Original description) The  small, acuminate shell is excavate at the base and below the suture. Its colour is buff, sometimes suffused with chocolate. 

An acicular protoconch of three whorls is followed by five adult whorls. 

Sculpture: Deep square meshes are enclosed by radial and spiral cords, with small prickles at the point of intersection. Both the radials and the spirals vary in their development. On the body whorl there may be from nine to twelve radials, and from fifteen to eighteen spirals. On the upper whorl there are from three to five spirals, the peripheral one dominating. 

Aperture :—The anal sulcus is sutural and rather deep. The outer lip is dentate by the projection of the spirals. The siphonal canal is rather long and straight.

Distribution
This marine species is endemic to Australia and occurs off Queensland and in the Gulf of Carpentaria.

References

 Powell, A.W.B. 1966. The molluscan families Speightiidae and Turridae, an evaluation of the valid taxa, both Recent and fossil, with list of characteristic species. Bulletin of the Auckland Institute and Museum. Auckland, New Zealand 5: 1–184, pls 1–23 
 Liu, J.Y. [Ruiyu] (ed.). (2008). Checklist of marine biota of China seas. China Science Press. 1267 pp

External links
 Biolib.cz: image
 

vacillata
Gastropods described in 1922
Gastropods of Australia